Real Life is the seventh studio album recorded by contemporary worship musician Lincoln Brewster.

Track listing

Album credits

Production 
 Michael Coleman – executive producer 
 Lincoln Brewster – producer
 Mike Johns – production assistant 
 Jay King – A&R/artist development
 Chico Gonzalez – A&R/artist development coordination
 Rick Thompson – A&R/Artist development coordination
 Anita Channell – production coordinator
 Sam Noerr – art direction 
 Jeremy Cowart – photography 
 Gary Dorsey – package design at Pixel Peach Studio

Technical
 Lincoln Brewster – recording and engineering at Brewhouse Studio, mixing (1-5, 9) at Brewhouse Studio
 Russ Long – additional engineer 
 Chris Carmichael – string recording (4)
 J.R. McNeely – mixing (6, 7, 8, 10) at ELM Studio South (Nashville, Tennessee)
 Nathan Dantzler – mastering at The Hit Lab (Nashville, Tennessee)

Musicians 
 Lincoln Brewster – lead vocals, backing vocals, keyboards, programming, electric guitars, acoustic guitars
 Blair Masters – keyboards, Hammond B3 organ
 Steve Padilla – keyboards 
 Jacob Sooter – keyboards 
 Tyler DeYoung – additional acoustic guitars (3)
 Levi Brewster – guitar punch-ins (4)
 Liam Brewster – guitar punch-in assistant (4)
 Norm Stockton – bass 
 Mike Johns – drums, percussion 
 Chris Carmichael – strings (4)
 Jeffrey B. Scott – backing vocals, choir director 
 Kari Jobe – harmony vocals (7)
 Liam Brewster, Peter Burton, Kelli Caldwell, Tyler DeYoung, Taylor Gall, Rachel Jackson, Mark Johnston, Cindy Maslov, Sandi Padilla, Steve Padilla, Corbin Phillips, Margie Ruiz, Jeffrey B. Scott and Sarah Sherratt – choir

References 

2010 albums
Lincoln Brewster albums